This is a listing of the horses that finished in either first, second, or third place and the number of starters in the Wide Country Stakes (1994-present), an American Thoroughbred Stakes race for fillies age three years-old at seven furlongs run on dirt at Laurel Park Racecourse in Laurel, Maryland.

A # designates that the race was run in two divisions in 1995.

References

External links
 Laurel Park website

Laurel Park Racecourse